Charlie Ewels (born 29 June 1995 in Bournemouth, England) is an English professional rugby union player who plays at lock for Premiership club Bath.

Personal life
Ewels grew up in Bournemouth, attending Moordown St Johns, Bournemouth and Bryanston schools. Ewels started playing rugby at the age of seven and captained Bournemouth School to a number of local successes playing in a number 8 role, forming a 'formidable' partnership with speedster and playmaker Chris Speers.

Ewels is also a keen car collector and takes his Ford Mustang to motor shows across the south west of England, where he regularly poses for photos with fans on the bonnet. This sentence was a subject on the "England Rugby Podcast", Ewels stated this to be false, he has never owned a Ford Mustang.

Club career
Ewels joined the Bath academy in 2009. In November 2014 he made his club debut against Glasgow Warriors in the European Rugby Champions Cup.

In March 2018 he started for the Bath side that were defeated by Exeter Chiefs in the final of the Anglo-Welsh Cup. In September 2019 it was announced that Ewels was the new club captain at Bath.

International career
In June 2014 Ewels was a member of the England under-20 team that won the 2014 IRB Junior World Championship. He partnered Maro Itoje in the second row as they beat South Africa in the final at Eden Park. The following year Ewels captained the side as they won the 2015 Six Nations Under 20s Championship and was also chosen to lead the side that finished runners up to New Zealand at the 2015 World Rugby Under 20 Championship.

Ewels received his first call up to the senior England squad by coach Eddie Jones on 8 May 2016 for a three-day training squad. On 19 November 2016 Ewels made his senior debut as a replacement for Courtney Lawes in an autumn international against Fiji. On 20 April 2017 he was named in the squad for the tour of Argentina and scored his first International try in the final test as England won the series. Later that year he scored another try in an autumn international against Samoa.

On 2 February 2020 Ewels started in the opening Six Nations fixture against France at the Stade de France and came off the bench in the final round as England won away to Italy to win the Championship.

On 12 March 2022, in the game against Ireland in the 2022 Six Nations Championship, Ewels was sent off after 82 seconds after clashing heads with Ireland's James Ryan.

International tries

References

External links
Bath Rugby Profile
Premiership Rugby Profile
European Professional Club Rugby Profile

1995 births
Living people
Bath Rugby players
England international rugby union players
English rugby union players
People educated at Bournemouth School
People educated at Bryanston School
Rugby union locks
Rugby union players from Bournemouth